Quadromalus is a genus of mites in the Phytoseiidae family.

Species
 Quadromalus colombiensis Moraes, Denmark & Guerrero, 1982

References

Phytoseiidae